This is a list of lakes (beels) and wetlands of Assam, India.

Tinsukia district
Maguri Motapung Beel
Udaipur Beel
Rampur Beel

Dibrugarh district
Lomghori Beel
Sasoni Merbeel
Dihingerasuti Beel

Sivasagar district
Boka Beel
Borboka Beel
Dikhowmomai Beel

Jorhat district
Gorormaj Beel
Borchola Beel

Golaghat district
Sankar Beel
Nabeel Beel
Goruchara Beel
Galabeel
Moridisoi

Dhemaji  district
Hollodunga
Somrajan (S)
Sornrajan (N)
Phutukabari
Keshukhana
Puwasaikia

Lakhimpur  district
Bilmukh
Morichampora

Nagaon  district
Somrajan
Mer Beel
Sibasthan
Samaguri Beel

Morigaon  district
Charan Beel
Morikalang Beel

Sonitpur  district
Dighali Beel
Kharoi Beel
Goroimari Beel

Darrang  district
Mailhata
Bodhisichi
Gathaia

Kamrup  district
Chandubi Lake
Dipor Bil
Silsako Lake
Mandira Beel
Bageswari Beel
Rongai Beel
Dora Beel
Selsela Beel
Sorusola Beel
Borsola Beel

Goalpara district
Tarnranga
Urpad Beel

Nalbari district
Ghograjan
Sothajan
Morasaulkhowa

Barpeta district
Kapla Beel
Chotkapla
Tabha Beel
Alpajan beel
Chikanchara Beel
Boira Beel, Kayakuchi

Gallery

See also
List of lakes of India

References

 
A
Assam-related lists
Lists of tourist attractions in Assam